The following is a list of the National Register of Historic Places listings located in Cayuga County, New York:

This is intended to be a complete list of properties and districts listed on the National Register of Historic Places in Cayuga County, New York. The locations of National Register properties and districts (at least for all showing latitude and longitude coordinates below) may be seen in a map by clicking on "Map of all coordinates".



Listings county-wide

|}

Former listing

|}

See also
National Register of Historic Places listings in New York

References

External links

A useful list of the above sites, with street addresses and other information, is available at Cayuga County listing, at National Register of Historic Places.Com, a private site serving up public domain information on NRHPs.

Cayuga County, New York